This is a list of public art in the London Borough of Merton.

Merton Park

Mitcham

Morden

Raynes Park

Wimbledon

Part of Wimbledon lies outside the borough of Merton; for other works located there, see

References

Bibliography

External links
 

Merton
Merton
Tourist attractions in the London Borough of Merton